Sierra Sports: Skiing 1999 Edition is a sports game developed and published by Sierra On-Line for Microsoft Windows in 1998.

Reception

The game received unfavorable reviews according to the review aggregation website GameRankings.

References

1998 video games
Sierra Entertainment games
Skiing video games
Video games set in 1999
Windows games
Windows-only games
Video games developed in the United States